The San Jose Stealth are a lacrosse team based in San Jose, California. The team plays in the National Lacrosse League (NLL). The 2008 season was the 9th in franchise history and 5th as the Stealth (previously the Albany Attack).

Regular season

Conference standings

Game log
Reference:

Playoffs

Game log
Reference:

Player stats
Reference:

Runners (Top 10)

Note: GP = Games played; G = Goals; A = Assists; Pts = Points; LB = Loose balls; PIM = Penalty minutes

Goaltenders
Note: GP = Games played; MIN = Minutes; W = Wins; L = Losses; GA = Goals against; Sv% = Save percentage; GAA = Goals against average

Awards

Roster
Reference:

See also
2008 NLL season

References

San Jose
San Jose Stealth season